City of Shadows may refer to:
 City of Shadows (1955 film), an American crime film
 City of Shadows (2010 film), a Canadian drama film